Aso Station is the name of multiple train stations in Japan:

 Aso Station (Kumamoto) (阿蘇駅) in Kumamoto Prefecture
 Aso Station (Mie) (阿曽駅) in Mie Prefecture
 Asō Station (吾桑駅) in Kōchi Prefecture